Bruno Pellizzari (5 November 1907 – 22 December 1991) was a racing cyclist from  Italy. He competed for Italy in the 1932 Summer Olympics held in Los Angeles, United States in the individual sprint event where he finished in third place.

References

External links

1907 births
1991 deaths
Cyclists at the 1932 Summer Olympics
Italian male cyclists
Olympic bronze medalists for Italy
Olympic cyclists of Italy
Olympic medalists in cycling
Cyclists from Milan
Medalists at the 1932 Summer Olympics